Schaefferia duodecimocellata is a species of springtails in the family Hypogastruridae.

References

Poduromorpha
Articles created by Qbugbot
Animals described in 1945